The United States National Historic Landmark Program is designed to recognize and honor the nation's cultural and historical heritage.  The program was formally inaugurated with a series of listings on October 9, 1960; as of August 21, 2020, there are 2,597 designated landmarks.  A National Historic Landmark (NHL) is generally a building, district, object, site, or structure, that is officially recognized by the United States government for its national historical significance.  A National Historic Landmark District (NHLD) is a historic district that is recognized as an NHL.  Its geographic area may include contributing properties that are buildings, structures, sites or objects, and it may include non-contributing properties.

The program is administered by the National Park Service (NPS), a branch of the Department of the Interior. The National Park Service determines which properties meet NHL criteria and makes nomination recommendations after an owner notification process. The secretary of the interior reviews nominations and, based on a set of predetermined criteria, makes a decision on NHL designation or a determination of eligibility for designation. Both public and privately owned properties can be designated as NHLs. This designation provides indirect, partial protection of the historic integrity of the properties via tax incentives, grants, monitoring of threats, and other means. Owners may object to the nomination of the property as a NHL. When this is the case the secretary of the interior can only designate a site as eligible for designation.

All NHLs are also included on the National Register of Historic Places (NRHP), a list of some 80,000 historic properties that the National Park Service deems to be worthy of recognition. The primary difference between a NHL and a NRHP listing is that the NHLs are determined to have national significance, while other NRHP properties are deemed significant at the local or state level.

Tabular listing
Most landmark designations are in one of the 50 states.  New York is the state with the most (270), and New York City, with 114 designations, is the city with the largest number of designations.  Of the states, North Dakota has the fewest designations with seven.  Three cities (New York City, Philadelphia, and Boston) have enough listings to warrant lists separate from their respective states.

A small number of designations have been made outside the 50 states.  Most of these appear in United States possessions.  The Virgin Islands have five listings, Puerto Rico has four, and island possessions in the South Pacific have six.  Five listings are found in Pacific island nations with which the U.S. has established a free association agreement, and one listing, the American Legation in Tangier (the nation's first foreign public property), is found in the unaffiliated Kingdom of Morocco.

Notes

References

External links

National Historic Landmark Program at the National Park Service
Locations of all U.S. National Historic Landmarks, current and former, for which coordinates are included in the list-articles listed above

 
National Historic Landmarks